Greatest Hits, Vol. 3 is the third greatest hits collection by American country music artist Ronnie Milsap. It was released in 1991 by RCA Records. The album's only single, "L.A. to the Moon," peaked at #45 on the Billboard Hot Country Singles & Tracks chart.

Track listing

Personnel on tracks 1 & 6
Jamie Brantley - electric guitar, background vocals
Steve Brantley - background vocals
Mark Casstevens - acoustic guitar
Carol Chase - background vocals
Bruce Dees - background vocals
Stuart Duncan - fiddle
Steve Gibson - electric guitar
Dann Huff - electric guitar
John Hughey - steel guitar
Mitch Humphries - keyboards
David Hungate - bass guitar
Shane Keister - synthesizer
Paul Leim - drums, percussion
Ronnie Milsap - keyboards, lead vocals, background vocals
 Weldon Myrick  - steel guitar
The Nashville String Machine - strings
Hargus "Pig" Robbins - keyboards
Lisa Silver - background vocals
Billy Joe Walker Jr. - acoustic guitar
Cindy Richardson-Walker - background vocals
Bergen White - string arrangements

References

1991 greatest hits albums
Ronnie Milsap albums
RCA Records compilation albums